The Ukrainian brook lamprey (Eudontomyzon mariae) is a species of lamprey in the Petromyzontidae family. It is found in brackish and freshwater areas in Austria, Belarus, Bulgaria, the Czech Republic, Georgia, Hungary, Moldova, North Macedonia, Poland, Romania, Russia, Serbia and Montenegro, Slovakia, Turkey, and Ukraine. It invaded the basin of the Volga River in 2001.

Biology
The Ukrainian brook lamprey reaches a maximum length of 22 cm. It inhabits the mountain and foothill bodies of water containing clear water with strong currents. It is a non-parasitic lamprey. They are preyed on by chub and other species during spawning, which takes place on gravel and sand substrates.

References

Eudontomyzon
Freshwater fish of Europe
Fish of Europe
Taxonomy articles created by Polbot
Fish described in 1931